Vanessa Phuang Herrmann, nicknamed Na-Chatra or Van (born July 17, 1991) is a Thai-German actress and model who was crowned Miss Thailand World 2012 and represented Thailand at Miss World 2012 in Ordos City, Inner Mongolia, China.

Early life and education
Herrmann was born in Phuket to a German father, Reiner Herrmann, and a Thai mother, Padmawadee Muangkot. Her father died from cancer when Herrmann was six years old. She was a student at Satree Phuket School and graduated from Ramkhamhaeng University with a bachelor's degree in Arts Program in Mass Communication.

Pageantry
On March 24, 2012, Herrmann was crowned Miss Thailand World 2012.

Filmography

Television dramas
 2016 Lah Dup Tawan (ล่าดับตะวัน) (/Ch.8) as Panward (ปานวาด) with
 2017 Ngao Arthun (เงาอาถรรพ์) (Good Day Reconciliation/Ch.8) as Sarapee / Soipee (สร้อยพี) with
 2018 Preng Lap Lae (เพรงลับแล) (/Ch.8) as Nethmaya (เนตรมายา (เจ้าแม่เนตรตาทิพย์)) with
 2020 Khum Sab Lum Kong (ขุมทรัพย์ลำโขง) (/Ch.8) as Shilley (เจ้านางฉวีลักษณ์ (อดีต) / ชลดา วนวีรกิจ (ชิลลี่) (ปัจจุบัน)) with Sarawut Marttong / Somchai Kemglad
 2022 Sisa Marn (2022) (ศีรษะมาร) (Bear In Mind Studios/Ch.8) as Fahsai (lawyer / Sakkan's ex) (ฟ้าใส จริยาสว่างกุล (ฟ้า)) with
 2022 Dong Dok Mai 2022 (ดงดอกไม้) (The ONE Enterprise-CHANGE2561/One 31) as Sandy (แซนดี้)

Television series

Television sitcom

MC
 Television 
 2015 :  (เคาะประตูดูช่อง 8) On Air Ch.8

References

External links
Official site of Miss Thailand World
Phuket model in Thai Supermodel Contest

1991 births
Living people
Miss World 2012 delegates
Vanessa Herrmann
Vanessa Herrmann
Vanessa Herrmann
Vanessa Herrmann
Vanessa Herrmann
Vanessa Herrmann
Vanessa Herrmann
Vanessa Herrmann
Vanessa Herrmann
Vanessa Herrmann
Vanessa Herrmann
Vanessa Herrmann
Miss Thailand World